Death of a Sideman is an album by David Murray which was released on the Japanese DIW label in 1992. It features performances by Murray, trumpeter Bobby Bradford, pianist Dave Burrell, bassist Fred Hopkins and drummer Ed Blackwell of a set of compositions by Bradford.

Reception
The Allmusic review by Brian Olewnick awarded the album 4 stars stating "Death of a Sideman is one of the stronger efforts in Murray's mature catalog, thanks in no small part to the presence and guiding hand of Bobby Bradford. Recommended.".

Track listing
 "Have You Seen Sideman?" - 9:01 
 "Woodshedetude" - 5:30
 "Waiting for Thelonious" - 10:36 
 "A Little Pain" - 6:15
 "Sidesteps" - 6:56 
"The Gates of Hell" - 6:51 
 "Bosom of Abraham" - 7:31 
 "Have You Seen Sideman?" - 5:10
All compositions by Bobby Bradford
Recorded 1991

Personnel
David Murray – tenor saxophone, bass clarinet
Bobby Bradford – trumpet
Dave Burrell – piano
Fred Hopkins – bass
Ed Blackwell – drums

References 

1992 albums
David Murray (saxophonist) albums
DIW Records albums